Native title in Australia is the common law doctrine which is the recognition by Australian law that Indigenous Australians have rights and interests to their land that derive from their traditional laws and customs. Native title claims may be made in any Australian jurisdiction under the Native Title Act 1993. Claims made in the State of South Australia are listed below by date of lodgement. Claims are claimed by the federal and the state government.

See also
Registered Native Title Body Corporate

References

External links

Native title in Australia
Indigenous Australians in South Australia
Australian Aboriginal culture